In Greek mythology, Rhacius  was the son of Lebes, and the leader of the first Greeks to settle in Caria, and became King of Caria. His court was located at Colophon in Ionia.  With his wife Manto, daughter of the seer Tiresias, he was the father of Mopsus, a renowned seer.
Kings in Greek mythology

Ancient Greeks in Caria
Greek mythology of Anatolia